This is a list of episodes of the Japanese anime H2O: Footprints in the Sand. The episodes are directed by Hideki Tachibana and produced by the Japanese animation studio Zexcs. The anime is based on the visual novel of the same name by the Japanese software company Makura, and follows the story of Takuma Hirose, a blind young male high school student, who moves from the city to a rural area where he meets three girls who he gradually gets to know named Hayami Kohinata, Hinata Kagura, and Otoha. The anime started airing on January 4, 2008 on the Fukui TV Japanese television network. Two pieces of theme music are used for the episodes; one opening theme and one ending theme.

Episodes

References

External links
Anime official website 

H2O: Footprints in the Sand